Grégory Ursule (born 14 January 1977 in Rodez) is a French professional football player. Currently, he plays in the Championnat National for Rodez AF.

He played on the professional level in Ligue 1 for AC Ajaccio and in Ligue 2 for AC Ajaccio and FC Gueugnon.

People from Rodez
1977 births
Living people
French footballers
French people of Guadeloupean descent
Ligue 1 players
Ligue 2 players
AC Ajaccio players
FC Gueugnon players
Rodez AF players
Association football midfielders
Sportspeople from Aveyron
Footballers from Occitania (administrative region)